A list of films produced in Argentina in 1984:

External links 
 Argentine films of 1984 at the Internet Movie Database

1984
Argentine
Films